Amos William Butler (1 October 1860 – 5 August 1937) was an American naturalist.

Early life and education
Amos Butler was born on 1 October 1860 in Brookville, Indiana to mother Hannah Wright Butler and father William W. Butler. Amos Butler's grandfather, also named Amos Butler, was the first settler of Brookville. Starting in 1877, Butler attended Hanover College. He then went on to attend Indiana University Bloomington, where he was a member of Phi Beta Kappa and Sigma Xi, an honorary scientific fraternity.

Career
Butler founded several organizations, including the Brookville Society of Natural History in 1881 and the Indiana Academy of Science in 1885. He was also a member of several other organizations, including the American Ornithologists' Union, Wilson Ornithological Club, the Biological Society of Washington, the Cincinnati Society of Natural History, and the Nature Study Club of Indiana.

Honors
Butler had a species of snake named after him, Butler's garter snake (Thamnophis butleri).
A chapter of the National Audubon Society in Central Indiana is called the Amos Butler Audubon Society.
In 1903, Butler's biography was included in Who's Who in America.
In 1910, his biography was included in American Men of Science.

Personal life
Butler married Mary I. Reynolds and had at least one child, a daughter named Carrie Butler Watts.

References

External links

1860 births
1937 deaths
People from Brookville, Indiana
Hanover College alumni
Indiana University Bloomington alumni
American naturalists
Indiana University faculty
Purdue University faculty
University of Chicago faculty